Sir John Harold Horlock FRS FREng (19 April 1928 – 22 May 2015) was a British professor of mechanical engineering, and was vice-chancellor of both the Open University and the University of Salford, as well as vice-president of the Royal Society. In 1977, he was elected a fellow of the Royal Academy of Engineering

Education and early life 
Horlock was raised in North London and attended The Latymer School, Edmonton. He went from there to St John's College, Cambridge where he gained his PhD in 1958.

Career 

In spite of a job offer by Rolls-Royce, Horlock accepted the role of professor and head of the mechanical engineering department at University of Liverpool. He returned to Cambridge as professor of engineering in 1967, and in 1973 he founded the department's Whittle Laboratory, also becoming its director.

In 1981, Horlock began working for the Open University. Whilst there he tackled the government over spending cuts, introduced a taught postgraduate masters programme, and expanded the OU.
Following his retirement he was treasurer and later vice-president of the Royal Society.

Research 
Horlock's main area of research was turbomachinery, particularly gas turbines, compressors and jet engines.

Selected books and book chapters

Selected journal articles

Honours  and awards
Horlock won numerous awards including:

 Elected a Fellow of the Royal Society (FRS) in 1976
1980 received an Honorary Doctorate from Heriot-Watt University 
 Elected to the National Academy of Engineering in 1988
1996 He was given a knighthood in the 1996 New Year Honours, for services to science, engineering and education.
2001 James Alfred Ewing Medal from the Institution of Civil Engineers

The Horlock building on the Open University's Walton Hall campus was named in his honour in 1989, and the Association of Open University Graduates' Sir John Horlock Award for Science was established two years later in 1991.

References

External links
 The AOUG Sir John Horlock Award for Science, Association of Open University Graduates (AOUG)
 Whittle Laboratory, Cambridge University Engineering Department 
 School of Engineering, Liverpool University
 Mechanical Engineering, School of Computing, Science and Engineering, University of Salford, Greater Manchester

1928 births
2015 deaths
People from Edmonton, London
Alumni of St John's College, Cambridge
Academics of the University of Liverpool
Academics of the University of Salford
Academics of the Open University
Engineers from London
Fellows of the Royal Society
Fellows of the Royal Academy of Engineering
People educated at The Latymer School
Knights Bachelor
Professors of engineering (Cambridge)